Bangana xanthogenys is a species of cyprinid fish endemic to China and Vietnam.

References

Bangana
Fish described in 1936